George Flippin (February 8, 1868 – May 15, 1929) was an American football left halfback and a doctor in Nebraska. He was the first star player of the Nebraska Cornhuskers football team, the first Black player on the team, and among the first Black players nationwide. He was inducted into the Nebraska Football Hall of Fame in 1974.

Young life

Flippin's father, Charles, was a freed slave who fought in the Civil War on the Union side in the 14th United States Colored Infantry Regiment, then became a doctor. Charles and Mahala Flippin had their son George in Ohio in 1868, three years after the end of the Civil War. When George's mother Mahala died in 1871, his father and brother moved away, first to Kansas, then to Henderson, Nebraska in 1888.

Football career

George Flippin attended the University of Nebraska in Lincoln from 1891 to 1894.

Football was a young sport. A University of Nebraska football team had only existed for a few months at the time Flippin arrived on campus. He began to play for the 1891 Nebraska Old Gold Knights football team. Flippin's first game, against the Iowa Hawkeyes, was the fifth game in the university's history. He proved talented, and quickly become the star of the new team.

Because of Flippin’s presence on the Nebraska team, the Missouri team refused to play a scheduled football game on November 5, 1892, forfeiting what would have been the first meeting between the two teams. Nebraska's student newspaper mocked the segregated Missouri team, saying that Missouri's anti-black bigotry would cause them to lose the football game just as they lost the American Civil War. The paper claimed racial inclusion as a part of Nebraska's identity.

Flippin experienced racism. He was denied entrance to an opera house after a game in Denver, and he sued a bathhouse in Lincoln for refusing to admit him because of his race. A restaurant in Omaha relegated the football team to a private dining room rather than allow Flippin to be seen in the public area.

His teammates elected him team captain after the 1894 season. Nebraska's football coach, Frank Crawford, would not allow a Black man to be team captain.

Flippin left Nebraska and studied medicine in Chicago. He paid for school by playing football for College of Physicians and Surgeons in Chicago at $75 per season.

Flippin was inducted into the Nebraska Football Hall of Fame in 1974.

Later life

After earning a medical degree in Chicago, he served as a doctor in Stromsburg, Nebraska until his death in 1929. He established the community's first hospital. In 1910 he married Stromsburg schoolteacher Mertina Larson; because interracial marriage was unlawful in Nebraska, Flippin and the white Larson were married in Iowa. He is the only Black person buried in the Stromsburg cemetery.

References

1868 births
1929 deaths
19th-century players of American football
American physicians
African-American sportsmen